Aristida acuta is a native Australian species of grass. Found in New South Wales and Queensland.

References

aucuta
Flora of New South Wales
Flora of Queensland